Norco may refer to:

Places
 Norco, California, U.S.
 Norco Hills, or La Sierra Heights, section of the Temescal Mountains
 Norco, Louisiana, U.S.

Other uses
 Norco Bicycles, a Canadian bicycle manufacturer
 Norco Co-operative, an agricultural supply and marketing co-operative, New South Wales, Australia
 Northern Co-operative Society (Norco), a defunct Aberdeen, Scotland co-operative society
 Norco, a brand name for the fixed-dose combination opioid pain medication hydrocodone/paracetamol
 NORCO (video game), a point-and-click video game set in a fictional version of Norco, Louisiana

See also
 Norco shootout